Willem A. VanGemeren (born 7 April 1943) is Professor Emeritus of Old Testament and Semitic Languages at Trinity Evangelical Divinity School. He is the author of a number of books, including Interpreting the Prophetic Word (Zondervan) and a commentary on Psalms in the Expositor's Bible Commentary series (Zondervan). He was a senior editor of the five-volume work The New International Dictionary of Old Testament Theology and Exegesis in which ten essays have been compiled to thoroughly explain proper hermeneutics and Biblical interpretation. He is a member of the Society of Biblical Literature, the Evangelical Theological Society, and the Institute for Biblical Research.

Life and education
VanGemeren was born to Jacobus Johannes Van Gemeren and Sarah Cornelia Langeveld in Boskoop, Netherlands, during World War II, and moved to the United States in 1962.

VanGemeren studied at Moody Bible Institute in Chicago and earned a BA from University of Illinois. He finished a BD in theology at Westminster Theological Seminary and studied as a graduate student in Hebrew University in Jerusalem. He earned MA and PhD degrees in the field of Old Testament at the University of Wisconsin. VanGemeren taught at Geneva College and Reformed Theological Seminary for eighteen years, and taught at Trinity Evangelical Divinity School.

Selected publications

Books

Editorial Work:  Academic Resources 
The New International Dictionary of Old Testament Theology and Exegesis.  Grand Rapids: Zondervan, 1997.  Translated into Arabic and Portuguese. .

Guide to Old Testament Theology and Exegesis.   Grand Rapids:  Zondervan, 1999. .

Chapters Contributed to Edited Works 
(1988). Systems of Continuity. In: J. Feinberg, ed., Continuity and Discontinuity: Perspectives on the Relationship between the Old and New Testaments in Honor of S. Lewis Johnson, Jr.. Westchester: Crossway,  pp. 37–62.  .

(1992).  Israel and the Church: A Response.   In Craig Blaising and Darrell Bock eds., Dispensationalism, Israel and the Church.  Grand Rapids: Zondervan. .

(1993)  The Law is the Perfection of Righteousness in Jesus Christ - a Reformed Perspective.  In Wayne Strickland ed.,  Five Views on the Law, the Gospel, and the Christian Life.  Grand Rapids: Zondervan.  Now published as Five Views of Law and Gospel.  Grand Rapids:  Zondervan, 1996. .

(1995).  Oracles of Salvation.  In Brent Sandy and Ronald L. Giese eds., Cracking Old Testament Codes: A Guide to Interpreting the Literary Genres of the Old Testament. Nashville: Broadman and Holman, pp. 139–55.  .

(2011)  Our Missional God: Redemptive Historical Preaching and the Missio Dei.  In Jason Van Vliet ed., Living Waters from Ancient Springs: Essays in Honor of Cornelis Van Dam.  Eugene, Oregon: Pickwick, pp. 198–217. .

(2011)  with Andrew Abernethy.  The Spirit of God and the Future.  In David G. Firth and Paul D. Wegner eds., Presence, Power, and Promise: The Role of the Spirit of God in the Old Testament.  Downers Grove: InterVarsity Press, pp. 321–45.  .

(2012) with Jason Stanghelle.  Psalms Superscriptions and Critical Realistic Interpretation of the Psalms.   In James K. Hoffemeier and Dennis R. Magary eds.,  Do Historical Matters matter to Faith?: A Critical Appraisal of Modern and Postmodern Approaches to Scripture.   Wheaton: Crossway, pp. 281–302.  .

(2013) Entering the Textual World of the Psalms: Literary Analysis.  In Andrew J. Schmutzer and David M. Howard eds., The Psalms: Language for all Seasons of the Soul.  Chicago: Moody Publishers, pp. 29–48. .

(2015) God’s Faithfulness, Human Suffering, and the Concluding Hallel Psalms (146-150): A Canonical Study.   In Gregg R. Allison and Stephen J. Wellum, eds.,  Building on the Foundations of Evangelical Theology: Essays in Honor of John S. Feinberg.  Wheaton: Crossway, pp. 263–84. .

Contributions to Study Bibles 
Geneva Study Bible. Nashville: Thomas Nelson, 1995. .

NKJV Study Bible. Nashville: Thomas Nelson, 1998.   .

Notes on "Psalms" and "Isaiah" in The New Living Translation.  Carol Stream, IL : Tyndale, 2008. .

Notes on "Genesis" in Gospel Transformation Bible. Wheaton, IL: Crossway, 2012.  .

Journal and Periodical Articles 
"Was Jesus Born in Nazareth?" The Presbyterian Guardian, Vol. 41 (Dec. 1972). PDF

"The Sons of God in Genesis 6:1‑4," Westminster Theological Journal 43 (1981), 320‑348.

"Psalm CXXXI:  Keg~mûl: The Problem of Meaning and Metaphor," Hebrew Studies, 23 (1982), 51‑57. Link to JSTOR Preview

"Israel as the Hermeneutical Crux in the Interpretation of Prophecy:  Part I."  Westminster Theological Journal 45 (1983) 132‑145.

"Israel as the Hermeneutical Crux in the Interpretation of Prophecy:  Part II."  Westminster Theological Journal 46 (1984) 254‑297.

"The Spirit of Restoration." Westminster Theological Journal 50 (1988), 81-102.

"Caleb - Ready to Follow God's Orders."  Decision. July–August 1988, 31-33.

"`Abba' -- in the Old Testament?" Journal of the Evangelical Theological Society 31.4 (1988), 385-98. PDF

"Prophets, the Freedom of God, and Hermeneutics," Westminster Theological Journal  52 (1990), 79-99.  Full-Text HTML.

"The Covenant is a Framework for Life and Family," Modern Reformation, March/April 1995, 7-10.

"The Prophets: Annotated Bibliography." Ministry Magazine. Tyranno Press (Korean), October 1999-March 2001.

“Daniel 9: The Problem of Interpreting the Seventy Weeks,” Ministry Magazine. Tyranno Press (Korean), June 2002.

”Kenosis, The Beauty of the Cross, and the Challenge of Social Justice in a Secular Age."  (Lecture presented to the Korea Evangelical Theological Society, November 2015).

“Christocentricity and Appropriation in Calvin’s Exposition of Daniel,” Torch Trinity Journal 19:2016, 223-54.

References

External links
Willem VanGemeren, PhD - The Old Testament & Justice
계산교회 / D r. VanGemeren , 그리스도의 충만함(Fullness of christ )

Old Testament scholars
Living people
American Calvinist and Reformed theologians
1948 births
Trinity International University faculty
Moody Bible Institute alumni
University of Illinois alumni
Westminster Theological Seminary alumni
University of Wisconsin–Madison alumni
American biblical scholars